Events from the year 1683 in England.

Incumbents
 Monarch – Charles II

Events

 9 January – Charles II gives orders establishing the dates on which he will perform the "Touching the King's Evil" ceremony.
 22 March – great fire in Newmarket, Suffolk.
 24 May – the Ashmolean Museum, Oxford, opens as the world's first purpose-built university museum.
 12 June – the Rye House Plot to assassinate Charles II is discovered; at least 11 people will be executed for their connections with it.
 21 July – Lord Russell is beheaded by Jack Ketch at Lincoln's Inn Fields for his part in the Rye House Plot.
 28 July – The Lady Anne, the King's niece and fourth in line of succession, marries Prince George of Denmark in the Chapel Royal at St James's Palace, London.
 12 December – start of exceptional cold spell. The River Thames freezes, allowing a frost fair to be held (pictured).

Undated
 Wild boars are hunted to extinction in Britain.
 The London Jilt; or, the Politick Whore, probably by Alexander Oldys, is published.

Births
 1 March – Caroline of Ansbach, queen of George II of Great Britain (died 1737)
 3 April – Mark Catesby, naturalist (died 1749)
 25 October – Charles FitzRoy, 2nd Duke of Grafton, politician (died 1757)
 10 November – King George II of Great Britain (died 1760)
 27 December – Conyers Middleton, minister (died 1750)

Deaths
 15 January – Philip Warwick, writer and politician (born 1609)
 21 January – Anthony Ashley-Cooper, 1st Earl of Shaftesbury, politician (born 1621)
 19 March – Thomas Killigrew, dramatist (born 1612)
 13 July – Arthur Capell, 1st Earl of Essex, statesman, implicated in Rye House Plot, suicide (born 1631)
 18 August – Charles Hart, actor (born 1625)
 21 July – William Russell, Lord Russell, politician, executed (born 1639)
 24 August – John Owen, non-conformist theologian (born 1616)
 25 October – William Scroggs, lord chief justice of England (born c. 1623)
 7 December
 John Oldham, poet (born 1653)
 Algernon Sidney, parliamentarian and republican, executed (born 1623)
 15 December – Izaak Walton, writer (born 1593)

References

 
Years of the 17th century in England